The women's team competition at the 2013 Southeast Asian Games in Naypyidaw was held on from 16 December to 18 December at the Royal Myanmar Golf Course.

Schedule
All times are Myanmar Standard Time (UTC+06:30)

Results

References 

Golf at the 2013 Southeast Asian Games
2013 in women's golf